Fodina johnstoni is a moth in the family Erebidae first described by Arthur Gardiner Butler in 1896. It is found in Malawi.

References

Endemic fauna of Malawi
Moths described in 1896
Calpinae
Lepidoptera of Malawi
Moths of Sub-Saharan Africa